Bosna is a ghost town in Collyer Township, Trego County, Kansas, United States.

History
Bosna was issued a post office in 1880. The post office was discontinued in 1921.

References

Former populated places in Trego County, Kansas
Former populated places in Kansas